Hinckley is an unincorporated community in Medina County, in the U.S. state of Ohio.

History
A post office called Hinckley has been in operation since 1825. The community has the name of Judge Samuel Hinckley, a land speculator from Massachusetts. A variant name was Hinckley Center.

Notable former and current residents
Connor Cook, an NFL quarterback for the Cincinnati Bengals, played college football at Michigan State
Matt Tifft, a professional NASCAR driver
Valarie Jenkins, professional disc golfer and four-time PDGA World Champion
Avery Jenkins, professional disc golfer and 2009 PDGA World Champion
Jim Donovan, the radio voice of the Cleveland Browns and sports director of WKYC-3 in Cleveland.

References

Unincorporated communities in Medina County, Ohio
Unincorporated communities in Ohio